The 2006 Radio Disney Music Awards were held on December 11, 2006, at the Radio Disney, Burbank, California.

Production
At that time, the Radio Disney Music Awards weren't a ceremony, it was a special edition on the Radio Disney broadcast. On November 16, 2006 the nominations were announced. The awards would be held on December 11, 2006. The Radio Disney Music Awards contained 21 categories, with 3 to 4 nominees for votes in 4 weeks.

Nominees and winners

Best Female Artist
Miley Cyrus
Kelly Clarkson
Rihanna
Vanessa Hudgens

Best Male Artist
Jesse McCartney
Chris Brown
Bow Wow
Billie Joe Armstrong

Favorite TV Star Who Sings
Miley Cyrus
Vanessa Hudgens
Alyson Michalka
Raven-Symoné

Best Group
The Cheetah Girls
Aly & AJ
Jonas Brothers
B5

Best Group Made of Brothers / Sisters
Aly & AJ
Jonas Brothers
B5
Everlife

Best Song
"The Best of Both Worlds" – Miley Cyrus
"We're All in This Together" – High School Musical Cast
"Breaking Free" – Vanessa Hudgens and Zac Efron
"SOS" – Rihanna

Best New Artist
Miley Cyrus
Vanessa Hudgens
Zac Efron
Lucas Grabeel

Best Team Anthem
We're All in This Together" by High School Musical Cast
"Get'cha Head In The Game" – B5
"U Can’t Touch This" – MC Hammer 
"We Are the Champions" – Crazy Frog

Best Dance Style
The Cheetah Girls
Chris Brown
B5
High School Musical

Best Song To Listen To While Getting Ready For School
"I Got Nerve" – Miley Cyrus
"Rush" – Aly & AJ
"Start Of Something New" – Vanessa Hudgens and Zac Efron
"Unwritten" – Natasha Bedingfield

Favorite Karaoke Song
"Too Little Too Late" – JoJo
"The Best of Both Worlds" – Miley Cyrus
We're All in This Together" – High School Musical Cast
"Breaking Free" – Vanessa Hudgens and Zac Efron

Favorite Song Your Teacher Likes
Too Little Too Late" – JoJo
"Crazy" – Gnarls Barkley
"Gonna Make U Sweat" – C+C Music Factory
"So Sick" – Ne-Yo

Best True Ringer Ring Tone
"Breaking Free" – Vanessa Hudgens and Zac Efron
"Too Little Too Late" – JoJo
"Confessions of a Broken Heart (Daughter to Father)" – Lindsay Lohan
We're All in This Together" – High School Musical Cast

Best Video That Rocks
"Come Back to Me" – Vanessa Hudgens
"Year 3000" – Jonas Brothers
"The Best of Both Worlds" – Miley Cyrus
"Chemicals React" – Aly & AJ

Best Song to Play While Doing Homework
"Get'cha Head In The Game" – B5
"Start Of Something New" – Vanessa Hudgens and Zac Efron
"U Can’t Touch This" – MC Hammer 
"Confessions of a Broken Heart (Daughter to Father)" – Lindsay Lohan

Best Song to Wake Up To
"Step Up" – The Cheetah Girls
"Start Of Something New" – Vanessa Hudgens and Zac Efron
"The Best of Both Worlds" – Miley Cyrus
"Too Little Too Late" – JoJo

Best Song From a Movie
"Life Is a Highway" – Rascal Flatts
We're All in This Together" – High School Musical Cast
"Breaking Free" – Vanessa Hudgens and Zac Efron
"Bop to the Top" – Ashley Tisdale and Lucas Grabeel

Best Song to Dance To
"Strut" – The Cheetah Girls
"Step Up" – The Cheetah Girls
We're All in This Together" – High School Musical Cast
"Beat of My Heart" – Hilary Duff

Best Song You've Heard a Million Times and Still Love
"Since U Been Gone" – Kelly Clarkson
"Too Little Too Late" – JoJo
"Confessions of a Broken Heart (Daughter to Father)" – Lindsay Lohan
"Come Back to Me" – Vanessa Hudgens

Best Song to Put on Repeat
"The Best of Both Worlds" – Miley Cyrus
We're All in This Together" – High School Musical Cast
"Come Back to Me" – Vanessa Hudgens
"Confessions of a Broken Heart (Daughter to Father)" – Lindsay Lohan

Most Stylish Singer
Miley Cyrus
Vanessa Hudgens
Alyson Michalka
Raven-Symoné

References

External links
Official website

Radio Disney Music Awards
Radio Disney Music Awards
Radio Disney
Radio Disney Music Awards
2006 awards in the United States